"Hitohira no Hanabira" is the first single by the Japanese rock group Stereopony. It was released on November 5, 2008, under gr8! Records. The main track, "Hitohira no Hanabira", was the 17th ending theme for the anime series Bleach.

The single reached #25 on the Oricon Weekly Charts.

Track listing
 
 
 
 "Hitohira no Hanabira" (Instrumental)

Oricon Sales Chart (Japan)

References

2008 singles
Stereopony songs
Bleach (manga) songs
2008 songs
Gr8! Records singles